Jordan Hill (born October 8, 1996) is an American professional soccer player who currently plays for FC Tucson in USL League One.

Career

Youth and college 
Jordan Hill played four years of college soccer for Davidson College. He finished his collegiate career making 65 appearances, scoring four goals.  Following his senior campaign, Hill was honored with Atlantic 10 First Team All Conference and United Soccer Coaches All Southeast-Region Second Team.

Senior 
During the 2016 NPSL season, Hill played with Virginia Beach City FC. He made three appearances for City FC.

After he finished his college career, Hill signed his first professional contract with Orlando City Soccer Club, Orlando City B. On March 30, 2019, Hill made his professional debut, starting in Orlando City B's season-opening 3–1 defeat to FC Tucson. He played the entire match.

References

External links 
 
 Jordan Hill at National Premier Soccer League
 Jordan Hill at Davidson Athletics

1996 births
Living people
American soccer players
Association football defenders
Davidson Wildcats men's soccer players
Expatriate soccer players in the United States
Orlando City B players
Sportspeople from Chesapeake, Virginia
Soccer players from Virginia
USL League One players
National Premier Soccer League players